Gymnasticos Syllogos Iraklis, commonly referred to as Iraklis, is a Greek multi-sports club based in Thessaloniki. The club was founded in 1908 as "Macedonikos Gymnasticos Syllogos" (Macedonian Gymnastics Club) and is one of the oldest and most historic sports-clubs in Greece. It is named after Heracles, the mythical Greek demigod. Their colours are blue or cyan and white, inspired by the Greek flag.

Iraklis traces its roots back in 1899 when Omilos Filomouson (meaning Friends of Music Club) was established. The club was established as a cultural union of the Greeks of Thessaloniki (then under Ottoman sovereignty), and in 1902 was founded also a sports department. After a merger with a local team, the club was re-founded on 29 November 1908, called Macedonikos Gymnasticos Syllogos (meaning Macedonian Gymnastics Club). A year later, "Iraklis" (Heracles) was added to the club's name as an honour to the ancient Greek hero.

Departments
 

Iraklis is considered one of the most historical and important Greek sport clubs and maintains departments in many sports, including:

Iraklis F.C. (founded in 1908, ceased to compete as a part of the club in 2011) - Football
Iraklis B.C. (founded in 1924) - Basketball
Iraklis V.C. (founded in 1921) - Volleyball
Iraklis Track and field (founded in 1908) - Track and field
Iraklis Handball (founded in 1994) - Handball
Iraklis Rugby union (founded in 2005) - Rugby union
Iraklis Ice hockey (founded in 2009) - Ice hockey
Iraklis Water polo (founded in 1975) - Water polo
Iraklis Swimming (founded in 1975) - Swimming
Iraklis Synchronized swimming (founded in 1995) - Synchronized swimming
Iraklis Freestyle wrestling (founded in 1967) - Freestyle wrestling
Iraklis Judo (founded in 1979) - Judo
Iraklis Amateur Boxing (founded in 1965) - Amateur boxing
Iraklis Weightlifting (founded in 1967) - Weightlifting
Iraklis Cycling (founded in 1972) - Cycling
Iraklis Fencing (founded in 1972) - Fencing
Iraklis Table tennis - Table tennis

Honours

Football
Greek Cup: 1
1976
Balkans Cup: 1
1985

Basketball
Men
Greek Championships: 2
1928, 1935

Women
Greek Championships: 3
1968, 1971, 1972

Volleyball
Men
Greek Championships: 5
2002, 2005, 2007, 2008, 2012
Greek Cups: 6
2000, 2002, 2004, 2005, 2006, 2012
Greek Super Cups: 4 (record)
2004, 2005, 2007, 2008
Greek Cup A1 Ethniki: 1 (record)
1999

Αthletics

Men
Greek Championships: 6
1975, 1976, 1979, 1984, 1985, 1986
Greek Cups: 2
1979, 1990

Women
Greek Championships: 1
1991
Greek Cross Country Championships: 6
1967, 1981, 1990, 1991, 1992, 2009
Greek Cups: 3
1989, 1990, 1991

Rugby union

Greek Championship Rugby Union: 1
2013

Freestyle wrestling
Men
Greek Championships: 11
2000, 2001, 2002, 2003, 2004, 2005, 2006, 2007, 2008, 2009, 2010

Fencing
Men
Greek Épée team championship: 1
1983

Women
Greek Foil team championship: 1
1978

European honours of team sports

Notable supporters 
Grigoris Arnaoutoglou, TV presenter
Thodoris Atheridis, actor
Ieroklis Michailidis, actor
Antonis Remos, singer
Dimitris Starovas, musician
Paschalis Terzis, singer

Gallery

References

External links
Official websites
Iraklis Gymnastics Club
Iraklis Football Club 
Iraklis Basketball Club
Iraklis Volleyball Club
Iraklis Track and field
Iraklis Swimming
Press
Blue Arena

 
Multi-sport clubs in Thessaloniki
Athletics clubs in Greece
Sport in Thessaloniki